ADP-ribosylation factor-like protein 6 is a protein that in humans is encoded by the ARL6 gene.

The protein encoded by this gene belongs to the ARF family of GTP-binding proteins. ARF proteins are important regulators of cellular traffic and are the founding members of an expanding family of homologous proteins and genomic sequences. They depart from other small GTP-binding proteins by a unique structural device that implements front-back communication from the N-terminus to the nucleotide-binding site. Studies of the mouse ortholog of this protein suggest an involvement in protein transport, membrane trafficking, or cell signaling during hematopoietic maturation. Alternative splicing occurs at this locus and two transcript variants encoding the same protein have been described.

References

External links
  GeneReviews/NIH/NCBI/UW entry on Bardet-Biedl Syndrome

Further reading